Jerónimo de Garro (flourished 1500s) was a 16th-century Basque nobleman, Viscount of Zolina and Knight of Calatrava.

Garro was born in Navarra, son of Sebastián de Garro and Isabel de Góngora. His wife was Ana Jaso Azpilcueta, owns the Castle of Xavier, and granddaughter of Juan de Jasso. Ana also was niece of Saint Francis Xavier.

References

External links 
navarchivo.com
euskomedia.org

Basque history
People from Navarre
16th-century nobility